Torreya clarnensis is an extinct species of conifer in the yew family Taxaceae solely known from the middle Eocene sediments exposed in north central Oregon.  The species was first described from a series of isolated fossil seeds in chert.

History and classification
Torreya clarnensis has been identified from a single location in the Clarno Formation, the Clarno nut beds, type locality for both the formation and the species. The average of the dates resulted in an age range of 45 to 43 mya. The beds are composed of silica and calcium carbonate cemented tuffaceous sandstones, siltstones, and conglomerates which preserve either a lake delta environment, or alternatively periodic floods and volcanic mudflows preserved with hot spring activity.

The species was described from a series of type specimens, the holotype specimen UF6510, which is currently preserved in the paleobotanical collections of the University of Florida and two paratype specimens, both of which are part of the National Museum of Natural History collections in Washington, D.C.  The fossils were part of approximately 20,000 specimens collected from 1942 to 1989 by Thomas Bones, A. W. Hancock, R. A. Scott, Steven R. Manchester, and a number of high school students.

The Torreya clarnensis specimens were studied by paleobotanist Steven R. Manchester of the University of Florida.  He published his 1994 type description for T. masonii in the Journal Palaeontographica Americana.  The specific epithet clarnensis was chosen in recognition of the type locality, the Clarno Formation.

Description
The seeds of Torreya clarnensis are fusiform and bilaterally symmetrical with a pointed tip and base. The seeds are identified as from a Torreya species by several features of the exterior morphology. The overall cross section shape is obovate, with an acutely rounded base where an aril would have attached, a keeled apex, and a pair of vascular scars near the tip. The seeds have a pair of vascular pores positioned on the upper and lower surfaces approximately one third of the way below the apex. The apical area of the seed is defined by a keel created by the edges of the upper and lower faces.

References

clarnensis
Eocene plants
Eocene life of North America
Flora of Oregon
Paleogene geology of Oregon
Plants described in 1994
Fossil taxa described in 1994
John Day Fossil Beds National Monument
Extinct flora of North America
Prehistoric trees
Clarno Formation